Chris Byrd vs. Evander Holyfield was a professional boxing match contested on December 14, 2002 for the vacant IBF heavyweight championship.

Background
Evander Holyfield had lost both his WBA and IBF heavyweight titles to WBC heavyweight champ Lennox Lewis in 1999. However, Lewis would then be stripped of the WBA title after opting to face Michael Grant rather than the WBA's number one contender and mandatory challenger John Ruiz. As a result, Holyfield faced Ruiz on August 12, 2000 and regained the WBA title after defeating Ruiz by unanimous decision becoming the first four-time heavyweight champion. Holyfield's fourth reign, however, would be short-lived. Ruiz would capture the title in a rematch later in the year and the two fought to a draw in their third bout. Holyfield then met the former WBC and IBF heavyweight champion Hasim Rahman (who had recently lost his titles in a rematch with Lennox Lewis) in a WBA heavyweight title "eliminator" match with the winner to earn a shot at the WBA title. Holyfield picked up the victory by referee technical decision, but rather than face Ruiz for the WBA title for a fourth time, agreed to face Chris Byrd for the now vacant IBF version of the heavyweight championship. At the urging of promoter Don King, Lennox Lewis vacated the title shortly after defeating Mike Tyson, allowing King to put together the Byrd–Holyfield match with hopes of pitting the winner against the winner of the John Ruiz–Roy Jones Jr. WBA championship bout. Byrd came into the fight with an impressive 35–2 record and was two years removed from capturing the WBO heavyweight title after handing the previously undefeated Vitali Klitschko his first loss. Byrd then lost the title in his first defense to Vitali's brother Wladimir, but became the IBF's number one contender the following year after winning an IBF heavyweight title "eliminator" mini-tournament by defeating Maurice Harris and David Tua.

The Fight
The fight went the full 12 rounds, Holyfield's fifth consecutive championship fight to go the distance. The younger and quicker Byrd was able to keep the aging Holyfield off balance throughout the fight with his right jab. As the fight went on Holyfield seem to tire and took a more defensive approach, allowing Byrd to control most of the action. As a result, the judge's scores were lopsided in favor of Byrd. Two judges had Byrd winning by the score of 117–111, while the other had him winning by the score of 116–112. Holyfield would attribute his loss to a left shoulder injury he sustained early in the fight that he claimed prevented him effectively using his left hand.

Aftermath
Byrd's reign would last over three years and he would successfully defend his titles four times during that span with decision victories over Fres Oquendo, Jameel McCline and DaVarryl Williamson and a draw with Andrew Golota. His reign would come to an end on April 22, 2006 after losing a rematch to Wladimir Klitschko by seventh-round technical knockout.

Though it was not known if the now 40-year-old Holyfield would continue his quest for a fifth heavyweight title, he ultimately decided to continue on and met former IBF middleweight, super middleweight and cruiserweight champion James Toney in Toney's heavyweight debut on October 4, 2003. Holyfield had a strong first round, but Toney dominated the remainder of the fight before Holyfield's corner stopped the fight in the ninth. Holyfield then lost his third consecutive fight after losing by unanimous decision to Larry Donald. After nearly two years away from the ring, Holyfield returned on August 8, 2006 and proceeded to win his next four fights. He would gain two consecutive world title matches, first challenging Sultan Ibragimov for the WBO title on October 13, 2007 but lost by unanimous decision. Over a year later, Holyfield returned to challenge towering WBA champion Nikolai Valuev but lost a close majority decision.

Undercard
Confirmed bouts:

Broadcasting

References

2002 in boxing
2002 in sports in New Jersey
International Boxing Federation heavyweight championship matches
December 2002 sports events in the United States
Byrd
Boxing on HBO
Boxing matches at Boardwalk Hall